William J. Crain is an American lawyer from Louisiana and an associate justice of the Louisiana Supreme Court.

Education 

Crain is a 1979 graduate of Bogalusa High School. He graduated from with a Bachelor of Science from Louisiana State University in 1983. He received his Juris Doctor from Louisiana State University Paul M. Hebert Law Center in 1986.

Legal career 

He has served for 22 years as a partner and lawyer at the Jones Fussell Law Firm in Covington, litigating cases in both state and federal courts.

State judicial service 

He was a Judge of the Twenty-Second Judicial District Court from 2009–2013. From 2013–2019, he was a Judge of the Louisiana First Circuit Court of Appeal. He was sworn in as an appellate judge on December 14, 2012.

Louisiana Supreme Court service 

On June 26, 2019, Crain announced his intention to run for a seat on the Louisiana Supreme Court vacated by Greg G. Guidry. Crain headed to a runoff against Hans Liljeberg on November 16, 2019. On November 16, 2019, he went on to win the election, 57% to 42%. Crain was sworn in on December 11, 2019, by his father Judge Hillary Crain.

Memberships and affiliations 

He is a member of the 2011 inaugural class of the Louisiana Judicial Leadership Institute.

Personal life 

He has been married to his wife, Cheri Hackett Crain for 35 years. They have four children: William, Michael, Matthew, and Elizabeth. He is a parishioner at St. Timothy United Methodist Church.

Electoral history

References

External links 

1960s births
Living people
Place of birth unknown
20th-century American lawyers
21st-century American judges
Methodists from Louisiana
Louisiana lawyers
Louisiana Republicans
Louisiana state court judges
Louisiana State University alumni
Louisiana State University Law Center alumni
Justices of the Louisiana Supreme Court